Washington is a state with many bodies of water to cross, including Puget Sound, Hood Canal, the Columbia River and numerous smaller rivers and creeks. It has experienced a number of bridge failures before and after the well known Tacoma Narrows Bridge collapse in 1940.

Causes
The single greatest cause of failure in Washington has been flooding, frequently associated with severe storms, which then results in destructive bridge scour. According to University of Washington meteorologist Cliff Mass, Western Washington is "particularly vulnerable to such bridge losses, with long floating bridges and the powerful winds associated with our terrain and incoming Pacific cyclones."

List of bridge failures

See also 
 List of bridge failures

Notes

Citations

References

Washington (state)

Bridge failures

Infrastructure in Washington (state)
Lists of transport accidents and incidents